Carlos Roberto da Silva Santos (born April 2, 1981), known as Carlinhos, is a Brazilian footballer who plays for Hamyari Arak F.C. in the Azadegan League of Iran.

Club career
Santos came to Iran in 2006, after being loaned to Sorkhpooshan. In 2010, he joined Hamyari.

 Assist Goals

References

External sources
 Profile at Persianleague
 

1981 births
Living people
Brazilian expatriate footballers
Expatriate footballers in Iran
Hamyari Arak players
Campo Grande Atlético Clube players
Botafogo de Futebol e Regatas players
Shahin Bushehr F.C. players
ABC Futebol Clube players
Bangu Atlético Clube players
Association football forwards
Footballers from Rio de Janeiro (city)
Brazilian footballers